Andrew Winter (born 10 March 2002) is a Scottish professional footballer who plays for Hamilton Academical, as a forward.

Club career
Winter began his career with Hamilton Academical, joining the club aged 10. He played and scored in the UEFA Youth League and the Scottish Challenge Cup with the Accies underage teams before making his senior debut on 18 January 2020, a 5–0 win over Edinburgh City in the 2019–20 Scottish Cup fourth round in which he entered as a substitute and scored the fourth goal. He then made his first Scottish Premiership appearance the following week, again coming off the bench in a 4–2 defeat away to Livingston. His first start soon followed in the Scottish Cup, playing the entirety of a 4–1 home defeat for Hamilton at the hands of Rangers.

International career
He has represented Scotland at under-16, under-17 and under-18 youth levels.

Personal life
His father Brian Winter is a former football referee.

References

2002 births
Living people
Scottish footballers
Hamilton Academical F.C. players
Association football forwards
Scotland youth international footballers
Scottish Professional Football League players
Sportspeople from Wishaw
Footballers from North Lanarkshire